Mahmudvand (also Romanized as Maḩmūdvand; also known as Godār-e Maḩmūd and Godār-e Maḩmūdvand) is a village in Dehpir-e Shomali Rural District, in the Central District of Khorramabad County, Lorestan Province, Iran. At the 2006 census, its population was 43, in 8 families.

References 

Towns and villages in Khorramabad County